Rokovci is a village in eastern Croatia in the Andrijaševci Municipality of Vukovar-Syrmia County.

Name
The name of the village in Croatian is plural.

See also
 Spačva basin

Populated places in Vukovar-Syrmia County
Populated places in Syrmia